The LVII Maria Canals International Music Competition took place in Barcelona, Spain from March 19 to April 1, 2011. It was won by Mateusz Borowiak, who followed the steps of Andrzej Jasinski (1960) and Piotr Machnik (2004) as the third Polish pianist to win the competition. Russian pianists Alexey Lebedev and Alexey Chernov were awarded the 2nd and 3rd prize respectively, the former winning also the Audience Prize.

Jury
  Carlos Cebro (president)
  Maite Berrueta
  Hervé Billaut
  Thomas Böckheler
  Ian Hobson
  Yangsok Lee
  David Lively
  Raquel Millàs
  Ewa Osińska
  Stanislav Pochekin
  Montse Brunet (secretary)

Competition Results

First round

Second round

Semifinals

  Mateusz Borowiak
  Alexey Chernov
  Galina Christiakova
  Daria Kameneva
  Alexey Lebedev
  Shizuka Susanna Salvemini

Final

References
 El pianista Mateusz Borowiak, ganador del Concurso María Canals  La Vanguardia
 Programa General 2011
 Acta de resultats de la prova final

Piano competitions
Music competitions in Spain